Tokheho Sema (1932–2017) was an Indian politician from the state of Nagaland. He served as a member of the 'Nagaland Interim Body' which oversaw the formation of the state in 1963. In 2016, the Government of India awarded him the Padma Shri, the fourth highest civilian honour, for his contribution to public affairs.

Studies
Tokheho studied at the Government High School in Kohima and St. Edmund's School in Shillong.

Political life 
As part of the Nagaland Interim Body, he urged the Government of India for strong measures to prevent the escape to foreign countries of Nagas associated with the nationalist movement.

He served as a minister of the state, has contested the state assembly elections in 1993 as an Indian National Congress candidate and is a former leader of the Congress legislature party in the assembly.

References

External links 
 

Recipients of the Padma Shri in public affairs
Naga people
Nagaland politicians
Indian National Congress politicians
Living people
1932 births